The Ambassador Extraordinary and Plenipotentiary of the Russian Federation to the Republic of Iraq is the official representative of the President and the Government of the Russian Federation to the Prime Minister and the Government of Iraq.

The ambassador and his staff work at large in the Embassy of Russia in Baghdad. There is a Russian consulate-general in Erbil.

Background 

The historic relations between Russia and Iraq began when the latter was part of the Ottoman Empire. The Russian imperial government still showed wide interest in the region. Since the 19th century, a Russian consulate was functioning in Baghdad, due to the Shia Muslims' pilgrimage to the holy cities of Baghdad, Karbala and Najaf. After the Russian Empire annexed the North Caucasus and Central Asia this further increased due to the large Shia populations native to those regions. According to the Russian consul in Baghdad on 19 November 1890, 19,500 pilgrims from the North Caucasus and Central Asia visited the holy shrines in Iraq. However, after the end of the Ottoman rule in the region, the diplomatic mission was ended. 

Soviet Union re-established diplomatic ties with newly independent Iraq on 9 September 1944. In 1955, relations were disrupted by the Iraqi side. In July 1958, both countries resumed diplomatic relations.

Timeline of the diplomatic relations 

 25 August - 9 September 1944 - diplomatic relations were established at the mission level.
 3 January - 8 January 1955 - diplomatic relations were interrupted by the Iraqi government.
 18 July 1958 - an agreement was reached on the resumption of diplomatic relations at the embassy level.

List of representatives (1944 – present)

Representatives of the Soviet Union to the Kingdom of Iraq (1944 - 1958)

Representatives of the Soviet Union to the First Iraqi Republic (1958 - 1968)

Representatives of the Soviet Union to the Second Iraqi Republic (1968 - 1991)

Representatives of the Russian Federation to the Second Iraqi Republic (1991 - 2003)

Representatives of the Russian Federation to the Coalition Provisional Authority (2003 - 2004)

Representatives of the Russian Federation to the Republic of Iraq (2004 - present)

See also 
 Foreign relations of Iraq

References

External links 
 List of Soviet ambassadors to Iraq, from 1944-55
 List of Soviet ambassadors to Iraq from 1955-91
 Iraq at Ministry of Foreign Affairs

Iraq
Ambassadors of Russia to Iraq
Russia